Antioch High School is a public high school located in Antioch, California, United States. It is located at 700 West 18th Street between G and L streets. It is a comprehensive high school for grades 9-12.  There are about 120 teachers, and 20 maintenance and office staff. The administration consists of a principal and four vice principals. Departments at the school include English; mathematics; physical, earth, and life sciences; social studies; physical education; vocal and instrumental music; video, photographic, sculpted, painted and drawn arts; foreign languages; health and sports medicine; auto and wood shop; and engineering.

History
AHS opened in Antioch, California in 1955.  It is the second high school in Antioch, replacing the old high school (which is now the city museum). The school is currently being remodeled with upgrades throughout the entire school. This project is now completed.

Academies

EDGE 
In 2010, Antioch High started the Academy of Engineering and Designing a Greener Environment (EDGE) which is a pathway that integrates the core classes with an engineering class to give students a peek into careers in engineering. Professor Jason Ebner from UC Berkeley gives instruction at this institution.

Environmental Studies 
In 2012, Antioch launched an Environmental Studies Academy.

LEAD
In 2012, Antioch launched a Leadership and Public Service Academy.

Media/Tech 
In 2012, Antioch launched a Media/Tech Academy.

Notable alumni
Frank Beede, former NFL offensive lineman 
Gil Castillo, amateur wrestler; retired professional MMA fighter
Carmen Dragon, musical composer, arranger, and conductor
 Anthony C. Ferrante, director
Najee Harris, running back for the Pittsburgh Steelers
Mike Lucky, former NFL tight end
Gino Marchetti, NFL Hall of Fame inductee, and the league's MVP in 1958
Aaron Miles, former MLB infielder for the St. Louis Cardinals
the Mitchell Brothers Jim and Artie Mitchell, known for their strip tease and pornography businesses
Michael Shane Neal, portrait artist
Jeremy Newberry, former NFL offensive lineman
Jeff Pico, pitching coach for the Cincinnati Reds; former Chicago Cubs pitcher
Evan Pilgrim, former football offensive guard
Ron Pritchard, former football linebacker and professional wrestler; played nine seasons with the Houston Oilers and the Cincinnati Bengals
Duane Putnam, class of 1951, former football offensive guard who spent ten seasons in the National Football League for the Los Angeles Rams, Dallas Cowboys, and the Cleveland Browns
Alex Sanchez, class of 1984, former MLB pitcher for the Toronto Blue Jays in 1989 and all-Pac-10 standout at UCLA
Michael Semanick, class of 1981, Academy Award-winning motion picture sound mixer (The Lord of the Rings: The Return of the King and King Kong)
Gary Sheide, former football quarterback for Brigham Young University
Larry Silveira, professional golfer who played on the PGA Tour and the Nationwide Tour
Jason Verduzco, former CFL player and NFL coach.

References

Antioch, California
High schools in Contra Costa County, California
Educational institutions established in 1955
Public high schools in California
1955 establishments in California